Sudbury Municipal Road 55 is a municipal road in the city of Greater Sudbury, Ontario, Canada. Extending from Whitefish to Coniston under a variety of street names, most of the road's length is a former alignment of Highway 17 and the Trans-Canada Highway except for a short realignment on different streets through the city's downtown core.

The road's western terminus is a grade-level intersection with Highway 17 just west of Whitefish, approximately one kilometre east of where the four-lane freeway segment of Highway 17 begins. The intersection is expected to be converted to a full freeway interchange as the freeway is extended westward. Through the Walden area, the road's only official street name is Municipal Road 55, although the informal name Old Highway 17 may also be used. In Waters, just west of Municipal Road 24 into Lively, the road widens into a dual carriageway, and interchanges with Highway 17 just east of Mikkola. This portion of the route was decommissioned as part of the provincial highway system in 1980 with the construction of the freeway segment.

From the Mikkola interchange easterly, however, the route continued to hold the Highway 17 designation until the completion of the Southeast Bypass in 1995. This portion of the route continues east as an at-grade expressway into Copper Cliff, where the median narrows to a paved strip until reaching the Big Nickel Road interchange. At that interchange, the road narrows back down to a single carriageway, albeit one with multiple lanes of traffic in each direction, and no longer has any access control. The roadway also picks up its first true street name, Lorne Street, at the same interchange. Lorne Street continues to travel in a northeasterly direction into Downtown, where the MR55 designation transfers onto Douglas Street; this represents the route's main divergence from the former route of Highway 17, which continued along Lorne past the Douglas Street intersection.

MR55 follows Douglas Street a short distance easterly until a sharp bend in the road. The road then becomes Brady Street and continues into the city's downtown core. The street name later transitions to Lloyd Street, reconnecting with the former Highway 17 route, and later to The Kingsway. In 2008, the section of The Kingsway east of Falconbridge Road underwent a $6 million expansion from two lanes to four lanes. The city has also planned a short westerly extension of the Kingsway, which will bypass the primarily residential Lloyd Street by connecting the Kingsway directly to the existing intersection of Lloyd and Brady Streets; however, no time frame for this project has been announced as of 2019.

The road's eastern terminus is a signalized grade-level intersection with Highway 17 near Coniston. East of that intersection, the current route of Highway 17 is a continuation of the MR55 roadway — traffic using the highway's through route must turn at the intersection.

Rerouting

In 2015, MR 55 was rerouted through downtown Sudbury. The former route followed Lorne Street to Elm Street (MR35), and then traveled east along Elm Street to an intersection with MR80. MR55 continued straight through the intersection becoming Lloyd Street. The former route rejoins the current route a short distance later at the intersection with Brady Street.

Future

As the freeway alignment of Highway 17 is extended eastward and westward from its existing termini, Municipal Road 55 may also be expanded to incorporate additional segments of the current highway alignment.

The Ministry of Transportation is currently undertaking planning studies on a further realignment of the Highway 17 route through Nickel Centre toward Markstay. As well, a six-kilometre westerly extension of the existing freeway alignment in the Whitefish area, including a conversion of the existing Municipal Road 55 intersection to a full interchange, is currently in the planning stage. However, actual construction dates have not yet been announced for either project as of 2016.

References

Roads in Greater Sudbury
Former segments of the Trans-Canada Highway